The Lincoln Project is an American documentary television miniseries revolving around The Lincoln Project, directed by Karim Amer and Fisher Stevens. It consisted of 5 episodes and premiered on October 7, 2022 on Showtime.

Plot
The series follows The Lincoln Project, a PAC by former and current Republicans, to prevent the re-election of Donald Trump, while working to accomplish their goal, they are shaken by internal upheaval, sexual harassment scandals, and negative press.

Episodes

Production
Due to the U.S. federal government response to the COVID-19 pandemic, Fisher Stevens wanted to make an advertisement to hold then-president Donald Trump accountable, when he then discovered The Lincoln Project were already doing it.

In October 2020, it was announced Karim Amer and Fisher Stevens would direct a documentary series revolving around The Lincoln Project, produced by Amy Redford.
Initially set to be a film, the project turned into a series after turmoil and controversies occurred within the organization.

Notes

References

External links
 The Lincoln Project on Showtime
 

2020s American documentary television series
2020s American political television series
2020s American television miniseries
2022 American television series debuts
English-language television shows
Documentary television series about politics
Never Trump movement
Media about the Trump presidency
2020 United States presidential election in popular culture
Showtime (TV network) original programming